Iridium(IV) fluoride is a chemical compound of iridium and fluorine, with the chemical formula IrF4 and is a dark brown solid. Early reports of IrF4 prior to 1965 are questionable and appear to describe the compound IrF5. The solid can be prepared by reduction of IrF5 with iridium black or reduction with H2 in aqueous HF The crystal structure of the solid is notable as it was the first example of a three-dimensional lattice structure found for a metal tetrafluoride and subsequently
RhF4, PdF4 and PtF4 have been found to have the same structure. The structure has 6 coordinate, octahedral, iridium where two edges of the octahedra are shared and the two unshared fluorine atoms are cis to one another.

References

Iridium compounds
Fluorides
Platinum group halides